Juergen Peterson Sommer (born February 27, 1969) is an American former professional soccer player and coach.  He became the first American goalkeeper to play in the FA Premier League, when he signed to play for Queens Park Rangers in 1995. He has served as the United States national team goalkeeping coach. Later on, Sommer coached Indy Eleven in the NASL.

Youth and college
Sommer played soccer at Culver Military Academy in Culver, Indiana where he was an All-American. After graduation, Sommer walked on at Indiana University, where he quickly became the starting goalkeeper in 1987. He was named Collegiate Goalkeeper of the Year in 1990.

Club career
Sommer left Indiana to sign with Luton Town of the First Division in 1991. Sommer played for the next seven years in England for Queens Park Rangers, Luton Town and Torquay. In 1998, he made the jump back home to sign with the Columbus Crew of Major League Soccer, as a replacement for Brad Friedel, who had signed for Liverpool the previous year. Sommer became the Crew starter over the next two seasons, and after a pair of major knee injuries, he signed with the New England Revolution. In 2000, he played one game with the Connecticut Wolves in the USISL A-League.  After another injury forced Sommer to the sidelines, and the emergence of Adin Brown as the Revolution's starting goalkeeper, he retired after the 2002 MLS Cup. He represented English side Bolton Wanderers for just one FA Cup game against Blackburn Rovers in February 2001. Sommer answered an S.O.S. by Wanderers manager Sam Allardyce who saw his other goalkeepers either injured or ineligible but was himself injured during the match.

International career
Throughout his career, Sommer earned ten caps for the United States national team, and was a member of the team which competed at the 1994 and 1998 FIFA World Cups. Although many believe him to be a solid goalkeeper in his prime, the play of Brad Friedel, Kasey Keller and Tony Meola greatly reduced his chances of seeing an extended run in the national team.

References

1969 births
Living people
1994 FIFA World Cup players
1995 Copa América players
1998 CONCACAF Gold Cup players
1998 FIFA World Cup players
American soccer players
American expatriate soccer players
Bolton Wanderers F.C. players
Brighton & Hove Albion F.C. players
Columbus Crew players
Connecticut Wolves players
Expatriate footballers in England
American expatriate sportspeople in England
Association football goalkeepers
Luton Town F.C. players
Major League Soccer players
New England Revolution players
Soccer players from New York City
Premier League players
Queens Park Rangers F.C. players
Torquay United F.C. players
United States men's international soccer players
USL First Division players
American people of German descent
North American Soccer League coaches
Indy Eleven coaches
Culver Academies alumni